Black Lamp may refer to:
 Black Lamp (game), a 1988 platform game
 Black Lamp (revolutionary group), an early 19th-century British revolutionary organization
 Black Lamp, an alias of the DC Comics character Hop Harrigan

See also
 Black light
 Lamp black
 Black Lantern